The White Hope may refer to:

 The White Hope (1915 film), a silent film directed by Frank Wilson
 The White Hope (1922 film), a silent film also directed by Frank Wilson

See also
 Great White Hope (disambiguation)